Grand Festival (Serbian Cyrillic: Гранд фестивал) is a competitive festival of pop-folk and turbo-folk music, organized by Grand Production.

Format 

In the first edition of the competition organized two evenings. In 2008. was the first contest to have two semi-finals with 22 songs. Top 12 from each semi-final has gone to the final. For the third edition festival introduced a rule that 50% of the votes given the jury, and 50% of the audience.

The most successful contestants receive money prizes.

References 

Music competitions
Music festivals in Serbia
Music festivals established in 2006
Folk festivals in Serbia